Beck – Kartellen (English: Beck – The Cartel) is a 2002 Swedish police film about Martin Beck, directed by Kjell Sundvall.

Cast 
 Peter Haber as Martin Beck
 Mikael Persbrandt as Gunvald Larsson
 Malin Birgerson as Alice Levander
 Marie Göranzon as Margareta Oberg
 Hanns Zischler as Josef Hillman
 Ingvar Hirdwall as Martin Beck's neighbour
 Rebecka Hemse as Inger (Martin Beck's daughter)
 Jimmy Endeley as Robban
 Mårten Klingberg as Nick
 Peter Hüttner as Oljelund
 Rafael Edholm as Alexander
 Basia Frydman as Iro
 Bo Höglund as Mats (the waiter)
 Anne-Li Norberg as Eva Örnberg
 Pontus Gustafsson as Bo Göransson
 Mats Rudal as Tommy Stenlid
 Roland Hedlund as Bergstrand
 Georgi Staykov as Bojan

References

External links 

2000s crime films
2002 television films
2002 films
Films directed by Kjell Sundvall
Martin Beck films
2000s Swedish-language films
2000s police procedural films
Films about the Serbian Mafia
2000s Swedish films